The Unistat computer program is a statistical data analysis tool featuring two modes of operation: The stand-alone user interface is a complete workbench for data input, analysis and visualization while the Microsoft Excel add-in mode extends the features of the mainstream spreadsheet application with powerful analytical capabilities.

With its first release in 1984, Unistat soon differentiated itself by targeting the new generation of microcomputers that were becoming commonplace in offices and homes at a time when data analysis was largely the domain of big iron mainframe and minicomputers. Since then, the product has gone through several major revisions targeting various desktop computing platforms, but its development has always been focused on user interaction and dynamic visualization.

As desktop computing has continued to proliferate throughout the 1990s and onwards, Unistat's end-user oriented interface has attracted a following amongst biomedicine researchers, social scientists, market researchers, government departments and students, enabling them to perform complex data analysis without the need for large manuals and scripting languages.

Procedures supported by Unistat include:
 Statistical graphics: Scatter plot, Line chart, Box plot, Probability plot, Histogram, Stem-and-leaf plot, Open-high-low-close chart, Bland–Altman plot
 Parametric statistics: Student's t-test, F test, Levene's test, equivalence tests for means
 Goodness of fit: Kolmogorov–Smirnov test, chi-squared test, Shapiro–Wilk test, Lilliefors test, Anderson–Darling test, Cramér–von Mises statistic
 Correlations: Pearson product-moment correlation coefficient, Spearman's rank correlation coefficient, Kendall tau rank correlation coefficient, Partial correlation, Intraclass correlation
 Non-parametric statistics: Mann–Whitney U, Hodges–Lehmann estimator, Wald–Wolfowitz runs test, Moses Extreme Reaction test, Median test, Wilcoxon signed-rank test, Sign test, binomial test, Noninferiority Test, Superiority test, Equivalence test, Odds ratio, Relative risk, Fisher's exact test, McNemar's test, Tetrachoric Correlation, Sensitivity and specificity, Prevalence, Youden's index, Positive predictive value, Negative predictive value, Likelihood ratios
 Kruskal–Wallis one-way analysis of variance, Friedman two-way analysis of variance, Cochran's Q test, Cohen's kappa
 Contingency table: Pearson's chi-squared test, Phi coefficient, Kendall's tau, Kendall's W, Cramér's V, Goodman and Kruskal's lambda
 Regression analysis: Linear regression, Stepwise regression, Nonlinear regression, logit/probit/gompit, logistic regression, multinomial logit, Poisson regression, Box–Cox transformation, Cox regression
 ROC analysis
 Meta analysis
 Analysis of variance
 General linear model
 Multiple comparisons / Post-hoc analysis: Tukey's HSD, Scheffe method, Studentized range, Duncan's new multiple range test, Tukey's range test, Bonferroni, Student–Newman–Keuls
 Multivariate analysis: Cluster analysis, Principal components analysis, Linear discriminant analysis, canonical analysis, Multidimensional scaling, Canonical correlation analysis
 Time series: ARIMA, Exponential moving average
 Reliability analysis
 Survival analysis: Life table, Kaplan–Meier analysis, Cox regression
 Quality control / Statistical process control: Control chart, Run chart, EWMA chart, Pareto chart, Process capability, ANOVA Gage R&R, Weibull distribution
 Bioassay Analysis: This optional module features potency estimation with Dilution assay, parallel line, slope ratio and quantal response methods, with Fieller confidence intervals, validity tests, ED50 and graphical representations.

References 
 Scientific Computing World
 Applied Statistics
 American Statistician
 Nature
 Science
 Mathematical and Statistical Psychology
 Computer Applications in the Biosciences

Statistical software
Science software for Windows
Windows-only software